Mindy Klasky is an American fantasy novelist. Klasky graduated from Princeton University and eventually became a lawyer. Once she realized this did not allow her to write, she became a librarian instead. Now she writes full-time.

List of published works:

Glasswrights' Guild
 The Glasswrights' Apprentice (2000)
 The Glasswrights' Progress (2001)
 The Glasswrights' Journeyman (2002)
 The Glasswrights' Test (2003)
 The Glasswrights' Master (2004)
From the author about her Glasswright series:
Rani Trader's story grows out of my own love of fantasy fiction. Rani is descended from the heros and heroines I've met and admired in the novels of Anne Bishop, Katherine Kurtz, and Patricia McKillip. At the same time, Rani is a unique, high-spirited individual - a proud, strong young woman who takes charge of the often-mystifying world around her. I hope that you will come to enjoy Rani's company as much as I have and follow her on her adventures in and around Morenia! 
Jane Madison
 Girl's Guide To Witchcraft (2006)
 Sorcery and the Single Girl (2007)
 Magic and the Modern Girl (2008)
 Single Witch's Survival Guide (2013) 
 Joy of Witchcraft (2015) 
 Capital Magic novella (2013)

As You Wish
 How not to Make a Wish (October 2009)
 When Good Wishes go Bad (April 2010)
 To Wish or not to Wish (October 2010)

Stand Alone Novel
 Season of Sacrifice (2001)
 Fright Court (2011) 

Short Stories
  "Cat and Mouse" in Not One of Us (September 1999)
  "Saving the Skychildren" in Realms of Fantasy (October 2000)
  "Catalog of Woe" in Space, Inc, ed. by Julie E. Czerneda (July 2003)
  "The Darkbeast" in Fantastic Companions, ed. by Julie Czerneda (May 2005)

Awards

Klasky won the Barnes & Noble's Maiden Voyage Award in 2000 for her novel Glasswright's Apprentice.

References

External links

 

20th-century American novelists
21st-century American novelists
American fantasy writers
American women short story writers
American women novelists
Princeton University alumni
Living people
Year of birth missing (living people)
Women science fiction and fantasy writers
20th-century American women writers
21st-century American women writers
20th-century American short story writers
21st-century American short story writers